Noon at Ngayon: Pagsasamang Kay Ganda is a 2003 Filipino drama film directed by Marilou Diaz-Abaya and written by Ricky Lee. Noon At Ngayon tells the story of four friends who reunite after many years of separation. The film examines how dreams are shattered and changed through the years because of life's troubles and how these people reconciled with their pasts to lead better lives in the present. The film is a sequel to Diaz-Abaya's 1982 film, Moral and was released on August 13, 2003, under Star Cinema.

Plot
Joey (Dina Bonnevie) comes home after nearly a decade of living in the States. With Joey back, the four friends find themselves complete again — they reminisce on the good old times, marvel at the changes in each other's lives. Indeed, a lot of things may have changed through the years, but some things remain constant. The ever-effervescent Kathy (Jean Garcia) gives up on her girlhood dream of becoming a singer—something which her sparklingly vivacious teenage daughter, Bernadette (Aiza Marquez), seems to have inherited. Sylvia (Eula Valdez) brings up her son, Bobby (Marvin Agustin), in ways that are more liberal, than most, ironically recoils at her grown son's only flaw: his infertility. Maritess (Cherry Pie Picache), a widow, contends with the complexities of being a mother to independent, self-asserting young adults: Guia (Jodi Sta. Maria), who chooses to remain single despite her pregnancy; Bryan (Paolo Contis), who's gay and proud of it; and Levi (Jericho Rosales), whose floater's ways hint at a yearning for something beyond what his present life can offer. Joey's stay in the States changes her a great deal; the untamed child of twenty years ago has matured into a woman who has come to embrace humanity and life. But pain and death may be realities that Joey has yet to learn to accept---because of her mother Maggie (Laurice Guillen), who is fighting a losing battle with cancer, and the main reason why she has come home. Bernadette persistently courts Bryan despite his openly gay orientation, only to have her heart broken by the futility of her feelings. Guia staunchly refuses to get back together with the father of her child in her desire to assert her self-sufficiency, but later realizes that needing people is not necessarily a sign of weakness. Bobby and his wife, Miriam (Dimples Romana), are torn between religion and science as they try to find a solution to their childlessness, while Levi finds love in the personification of Joey — the woman who loves the father he never got to know. As the four women try to reconcile past with present to cope with the changing times, the children come to terms with themselves, with the people they love, and with life on the whole.

Cast
Dina Bonnevie as Joey
Jean Garcia as Kathy
Cherry Pie Picache as Maritess
Eula Valdez as Sylvia
Jericho Rosales as Levi
Marvin Agustin as Bobby
Paolo Contis as Bryan
Jodi Sta. Maria as Guia
Dimples Romana as Miriam
Laurice Guillen as Maggie
Nonie Buencamino as Robert 
Lito Pimentel
Aiza Marquez as Bernadette
Patrick Garcia as Mike
Lorenzo Mara

Production
Lorna Tolentino was supposed to reprise her role as Joey for the sequel, however, due to disagreements over talent fee she instead went on to do Mano Po 2: My Home. The role of Joey went to Dina Bonnevie, who was originally set to star alongside Tolentino in Mano Po 2 but had left the production after the role originally meant for her was taken over by the latter.

Laurice Guillen is the only member of the cast to reprise her role from the Moral.

In addition, Valdez and Garcia were both reunited since Pangako Sa 'Yo which ended in the 3rd quarter of 2002. Patrick Garcia and Jodi Sta. Maria were also from the said primetime series but they also both reunited since Jologs and later remained in Darating ang Umaga alongside Valdez. Bonnevie and Picache were from Tanging Yaman (released in December 2000) together with Jericho Rosales  and Marvin Agustin (remained from Sana'y Wala Nang Wakas with her loveteam Kristine Hermosa, premiering in May). On the other hand, Jean Garcia also remains in Kay Tagal Kang Hinintay, where she played the female antagonist of the series Lady Morgana Frost-Arcangel .

Songs
"Can We Just Stop and Talk Awhile" - Jose Mari Chan
"Noon at Ngayon" - Carol Banawa

Awards

References

External links

2003 films
Philippine drama films
Star Cinema films
2000s Tagalog-language films
Films directed by Marilou Diaz-Abaya